Jacques Fourie (born 20 December 1996) is a Namibian cricketer. He made his first-class debut for Namibia in the 2016–17 Sunfoil 3-Day Cup on 17 November 2016. He made his List A debut for Namibia in the 2016–17 CSA Provincial One-Day Challenge on 15 January 2017.

References

External links
 

1996 births
Living people
Namibian cricketers
Place of birth missing (living people)